Rhys Millen (born 6 September 1972) is a New Zealand-born racing driver.

Nephew of IMSA GTS driver Steve Millen, son of Rodney and older brother of Ryan, is one of the America's top competitors in drifting. In 2011 Millen raced a 500 bhp AWD Hyundai Veloster in the US Rallycross championship. In the following years he competed in the Global Rallycross series.

Career 
Millen became just the second champion in the short history of the United States' top drifting series, Formula D, just a year after his good friend, Samuel Hubinette, became the maiden series champ. Millen has two wins in his Formula D career: the 2004 season finale at the Irwindale Speedway, and the 2005 season opener at the Wall Speedway in Wall Township, New Jersey. He became the highest placed non-Japanese driver in the US round of the D1GP event in 2005, making it to the last 8 after beating Masato Kawabata, only to lose to Yasuyuki Kazama through a "One More Time" rerun. Millen's father, Rod, also competes in drifting on occasion. In fact, Rod made his Formula D debut at the 2005 season finale at Irwindale, the same event where his son was crowned the champion.

Millen has driven a Pontiac GTO drift car for three seasons (Winning in 2004 and 2005, but losing out to Hubinette in 2006) and a Pontiac Solstice for the 2007 D1 Season. For the 2009 season, he will drive a Hyundai Genesis Coupe. Red Bull has been a major sponsor of Rhys' drifting efforts, as well as the paint schemes of many of his cars.

Besides racing, Millen is also a stunt driver for films such as The Dukes of Hazzard, Mr. & Mrs. Smith, and The Fast and the Furious: Tokyo Drift. He also did the driving for the first Hyundai Genesis Coupe commercial.

On 31 December 2008, he became the first person to back-flip an off-road truck in the air. He landed off-balance, forcing his vehicle to flip on its side a few times after landing, but then walked away unharmed.

In 2009, Hyundai teamed up with Millen to race the Hyundai Genesis Coupe at the Formula Drift Professional Drifting Championship, the Pikes Peak International Hill Climb and select Redline Time Attack Series events in 2009. On July of that year, Millen set a new rear wheel drive record to take Pikes Peak's time attack title.

In 2010, Millen, with navigator Antony Jay Hartley, partnered with Hyundai into the sport of rally.

Racing record

D1 Grand Prix

Formula D

Complete Global Rallycross Championship results

AWD

Supercar

Race cancelled.

See also
Hyundai PM580

References

External links

 
 Official Site
Formula D profile
Rhys Millen Documentary Mad Skills 
Rhys Millen Interview before attacking the Pikes Peak Hill Climb 

1972 births
New Zealand racing drivers
New Zealand rally drivers
American rally drivers
Drifting drivers
D1 Grand Prix drivers
Living people
Formula D drivers
People educated at Rangitoto College
Global RallyCross Championship drivers
New Zealand emigrants to the United States